Traci L. Kueker-Murphy is a United States Air Force brigadier general serving as the deputy director of strategy, plans, and policy of the United States Space Command. She previously served as the mobilization assistant to the deputy chief of space operations for operations, cyber, and nuclear of the United States Space Force. She has also served as the commander of the 310th Space Wing.

References 

Living people
Year of birth missing (living people)
Place of birth missing (living people)
United States Air Force generals
Brigadier generals